Giuliano Prini (S 523) is a of the Italian Navy.

Construction and career
Giuliano Prini was laid down at Fincantieri Monfalcone Shipyard on 30 July 1987 and launched on 12 December 1987. She was commissioned on 17 May 1989.

She had been homeported in Taranto between 1999 and 2004 and was subjected to radical works that affected the platform and the combat system.

Gallery

Citations

External links
 

1987 ships
Sauro-class submarines
Ships built by Fincantieri